The Consolidated Aircraft Corporation was founded in 1923 by Reuben H. Fleet in Buffalo, New York, the result of the Gallaudet Aircraft Company's liquidation and Fleet's purchase of designs from the Dayton-Wright Company as the subsidiary was being closed by its parent corporation, General Motors. Consolidated became famous, during the 1920s and 1930s, for its line of flying boats. The most successful of the Consolidated patrol boats was the PBY Catalina, which was produced throughout World War II and used extensively by the Allies. Equally famous was the B-24 Liberator, a heavy bomber which, like the Catalina, saw action in both the Pacific and European theaters.

In 1943, Consolidated merged with Vultee Aircraft to form Consolidated-Vultee Aircraft, later known as Convair. The Los Angeles-based Consolidated Steel Corporation is not related.

History
Consolidated Aircraft (and later Convair) had their headquarters in San Diego, California, on the border of Lindbergh Field (KSAN).

Consolidated's first design was one of those purchased by Fleet from Dayton-Wright, the TW-3 primary trainer, sold to the U.S. Army as the PT-1 Trusty. In September 1924 the company moved from the Gallaudet plant in Connecticut to new facilities in Buffalo, New York, and in the same year won a U.S. Navy contract for a naval version of the PT-1 designated the NY-1.

Lawrence D. Bell served as the Operating Head at Consolidated from 1929 to 1934. When the company relocated to San Diego, Bell decided to stay behind to start up his own company, the Bell Aircraft Corporation, in the former Consolidated plant.

In September 1935 Consolidated moved across the country to its new "Building 1", a  continuous flow factory in San Diego, California. The first production PBY Catalina was launched in San Diego Bay in 1936, and the first XPB2Y-1 Coronado test aircraft made its first flight in 1937. Consolidated vice president Edgar Gott was responsible for securing the company's contract to design and build the B-24 Liberator bomber. The XB-24 Liberator prototype made its first flight in December 1939, and the first production order was from the French in 1940, just days before their surrender to Germany; six of these YB-24 Liberators were designated LB-30A and ferried to Britain. 

In 1940, Consolidated bought Hall-Aluminum Aircraft Corporation and dissolved the company. Archibald M. Hall  was President of the company at the time and later became an executive of Consolidated. Several other Hall-Aluminum engineers and technical people were added to the Consolidated staff to meet defense production needs. By the fall of 1941, Consolidated was San Diego's largest employer with 25,000 employees, which eventually expanded to 45,000 by the following year.

In November 1941, Fleet sold his 34.26% interest in Consolidated for $10.9 million to Victor Emanuel, the president of AVCO, with the idea that Consolidated would be merged with AVCO's Vultee subsidiary.

To meet the needs of the military during World War II, General Henry H. "Hap" Arnold decided to open a regular air transport service between the U.S. mainland and the Southwest Pacific in April 1942. The Ferry Command chose Consolidated as the operating agency, forming Consolidated Airways, Inc., also known as Consairways. The airlines carried personnel, cargo and delivered aircraft to the Pacific Theatre. It was reported to have carried more than 101 million tons of cargo and had flown more than 299 million passenger miles when it closed in 1945.

In 1943, Consolidated merged with Vultee Aircraft to form Consolidated-Vultee Aircraft or Convair.

In March 1953, General Dynamics purchased a majority interest in Convair, where it continued to produce aircraft or aircraft components until being sold to McDonnell Douglas in 1994. McDonnell Douglas shut down the division after just two years of operations in 1996.

Aircraft

References

Footnotes

Notes

Bibliography

 Yenne, Bill. Convair Deltas from SeaDart to Hustler. Specialty Press: North Branch, MN, 2009. .

airplane manufacturer
Defunct aircraft manufacturers of the United States
Defunct manufacturing companies based in New York (state)
Manufacturing companies established in 1923
American companies established in 1923
1923 establishments in New York (state)
Manufacturing companies disestablished in 1943
American companies disestablished in 1943
1943 disestablishments in California